Edier Frejd (born 16 December 1979) is a Colombian-born Swedish footballer.

Before moving to Norway, Frejd previously played for IF Elfsborg and GAIS in the Allsvenskan and UD Las Palmas in the Segunda División. After the 2014 season Frejd left Sandnes Ulf and joined domestic Eskilstuna City FK on a one-year contract.

Career statistics

References

External links 
 

1979 births
Living people
Swedish footballers
IF Elfsborg players
UD Las Palmas players
GAIS players
Raufoss IL players
Kongsvinger IL Toppfotball players
Sandnes Ulf players
Eskilstuna City FK players
Allsvenskan players
Segunda División players
Eliteserien players
Norwegian First Division players
Colombian emigrants to Sweden
Swedish expatriate footballers
Swedish people of Colombian descent
Expatriate footballers in Spain
Expatriate footballers in Norway
Swedish expatriate sportspeople in Spain
Swedish expatriate sportspeople in Norway
Association football forwards
Association football defenders